Igor Ivanovich Shklyarevsky (June 25, 1938 – September 8, 2021) was a Russian poet and translator. Shklyarevsky was a 1987 Laureate of the USSR State Prize. He died from complications of COVID-19.

References

1938 births
2021 deaths
Russian poets
Russian translators
People from Byalynichy District
Recipients of the USSR State Prize
Deaths from the COVID-19 pandemic in Russia